WIPO ST.3 is the World Intellectual Property Organization standard for the two-letter codes of countries and other organizations, such as regional intellectual-property organizations.  It generally follows ISO 3166-1 except for the non-country entries.

Current codes 

Rows in blue are not present in ISO 3166-2.  Rows in yellow are different from ISO 3166-2.  Codes AA, QM to QY, XA to XM, XO to XT, XW, XY, XZ and ZZ are available for individual or provisional use.

References 

World Intellectual Property Organization
Country codes